This is the discography of American instrumental rock band Johnny and the Hurricanes.

Albums

Studio albums

Live albums

Compilation albums

Singles

Notes

References

External links

Discographies of American artists
Rock music group discographies